Thymena, also called Thymaena or Teuthrania (Τευθρανία), was a town on the Black Sea coast of ancient Paphlagonia, at a distance of 90 stadia from Aegialus. 

It is located near Uğurlu in Asiatic Turkey.

References

Populated places in ancient Paphlagonia
Former populated places in Turkey
History of Kastamonu Province